Mulben is a hamlet situated at a crossroads that forms the intersection of the A95 road and the B9103 in the Moray council area of Scotland.

It lies on the Burn of Mulben, 6.5 km (4 miles) west of Keith. Upon the arrival of the railway in 1858 linking it with Keith in the east and Elgin to the west it developed allowing the establishment of a primary school and a small number of services. Although the railway still remains, the station closed in 1964 and the building is now a private dwelling.

Close by is the Glentauchers distillery to the east (opened in 1898) and the Auchroisk distillery to the west (opened in 1974). Tauchers Platform railway station served Glentauchers distillery and the hamlet of Tauchers.

Upon the hill that commands the heights above the hamlet, one's view from afar is dominated by the extensive complex of bond sheds that form Malcolmburn, owned by and for the maturation of Chivas Regal. A small farm upon the road that leads in that northerly direction called House of Mulben has also become a tourist attraction by offering such activities as archery, clay pigeon shooting, off-road driving with Land Rover Defenders, zorbing and the chance to fish in a small, private lake.

It is one of the few locations within the United Kingdom which cannot receive any broadband services, though provisions have been made by Highlands and Islands Enterprise (through the Digital Scotland programme) to consider upgrading the exchange to provide fibre broadband services.

References 

http://www.scottish-places.info/towns/townfirst4664.html

Villages in Moray
Hamlets in Scotland